National Accreditation Agency of Ukraine (NAAU) - is the Ukrainian national accreditation body, which claims that it works in accordance with international standard ISO/IEC 17011 and documents of international organizations (EA, IAF, ILAC). The government agency is part of the Ministry of Economic Development and Trade.

In November 2009, NAAU under Chairmanship of Mr. Dmytro Zorgach, have joined a BLA(for Persons) with EA.

External links
Official Web-site of the National Accreditation Agency of Ukraine

Standards organizations in Ukraine
Accreditation organizations
Ministry of Economic Development, Trade and Agriculture